The Gold Coast Historic District is located in Midtown Omaha, Nebraska. Listed on the National Register of Historic Places in 1997, this historic district covers approximately a 30 block area roughly bounded by 36th, 40th, Jones, and Cuming Streets. The neighborhood housed many of Omaha's cultural and financial leaders between 1900 and 1920, taking over from Omaha's original Gold Coast in prominence.

After the area was developed in the late 1800s and early 1900s the area had mostly middle and upper class residents, and it included mansions as well as single family homes, and also some apartment buildings and duplexes.  The West Farnam neighborhood, later called the Blackstone, was distinct from the Cathedral neighborhood at the time; both are  included in the larger Gold Coast.

About
This historic district was a trendy social hotspot in the 1920s, and was called the "Gold Coast" for its concentration of high-value homes. From 1880 through the 1940s several large mansions were built for upper middle and upper class commuters. During this time Omaha's downtown was a long trolley-ride away, and the community was in the country. Two neighborhoods within the district (the Blackstone and Cathedral neighborhoods) reflect the housing styles of the times. The Joslyn Castle neighborhood is also within the area.

The area is the location of several locally and nationally historically significant landmarks, including Joslyn Castle, Saunders School and St. Cecilia Cathedral, as well as several homes which are individually listed on the National Register of Historic Places.

Modern developments
The Omaha Women's Club moved into the Henninger House at 518 South 38th Street in the Gold Coast area in 1963. The Upstream Brewing Company named a blonde ale after the neighborhood in the early 2000s.

See also
 Old Gold Coast - The original Gold Coast neighborhood in Omaha
 Neighborhoods of Omaha, Nebraska
 Interactive map of Omaha historic districts

References

External links

 Gold Coast Historic District website
 "A History of the Gold Coast Historic District" by Adam Fletcher Sasse for NorthOmahaHistory.com
 Josyln Castle Neighborhood Association website

American middle class
American upper class
National Register of Historic Places in Omaha, Nebraska
Landmarks in North Omaha, Nebraska
Historic districts in Omaha, Nebraska
Neighborhoods in Omaha, Nebraska
History of Midtown Omaha, Nebraska
Historic districts on the National Register of Historic Places in Nebraska
Colonial Revival architecture in Nebraska
Tudor Revival architecture in Nebraska
Queen Anne architecture in Nebraska